Elder Bluff is a prominent and mostly bare rock bluff that forms a portion of the north side of Eielson Peninsula and overlooks Smith Inlet, on the east coast of Palmer Land. It was named by the Advisory Committee on Antarctic Names for Robert B. Elder, Chief of the U.S. Coast Guard Oceanographic Unit on the first International Weddell Sea Oceanographic Expedition on board USCGC Glacier in 1968.

References 

Cliffs of Palmer Land